Shaffer Creek is an  tributary of Brush Creek (Raystown Branch Juniata River) in Bedford County, Pennsylvania in the United States.

Shaffer Creek is formed by the confluence of Chapman Run and another Brush Creek (Shaffer Creek), and joins Brush Creek near Mench.

See also
List of rivers of Pennsylvania

References

Rivers of Pennsylvania
Tributaries of the Juniata River
Rivers of Bedford County, Pennsylvania